Poecilasthena limnaea is a moth in the family Geometridae. It is found in New Guinea.

The wingspan is 23–26 mm. The fore- and hindwings are whitish, the former with olive-grey lines.

References

Moths described in 1926
Poecilasthena
Moths of New Guinea